Thornton is a village near to Stainton in the town of Middlesbrough, in the borough of Middlesbrough and the ceremonial county of North Yorkshire, England.  It is in the local Stainton and Thornton ward of Middlesbrough, with a collective population of 2,300 as of 2005.

Villages in North Yorkshire
Places in the Tees Valley
Areas within Middlesbrough